Fametesta is a genus of gastropods belonging to the subfamily Thysanotinae  of the family Charopidae. 

The species of this terrestrial genus are found in Japan.

Species
 † Fametesta katoi 
Fametesta mirabilis 
Fametesta operculina

References

 Bank, R. A. (2017). Classification of the Recent terrestrial Gastropoda of the World. Last update: July 16th, 2017

External links
 Pilsbry, H. A. (1902). New land Mollusca from Japan and the Bonin Islands. Proceedings of the Academy of Natural Sciences of Philadelphia. 54: 25-32

Charopidae
Gastropod genera